Filipe Toledo (born April 16, 1995) is a Brazilian professional surfer who has competed on the World Surf League Men's World Tour since 2013. He’s a second-generation pro who grew up outside of Ubatuba, Brasil on the northeastern coast of the state of São Paulo. His father, and long-time coach, Ricardo, was a two-time national champion. In 2014, as his career took flight, Filipe convinced his entire family to move to San Clemente, California. 

In 2014, after also competing in some events on the Qualifying Series (WQS), Toledo became the WQS champion. In 2015, Toledo had one of the best year of his professional career on the WSL World Championship Tour (CT), managing to grab his first 3 CT event wins and getting at least one perfect 10 in each final he competed. Toledo was also the surfer with most CT event wins of the year and went on to finish the 2015 season in 4th place. In 2016, Toledo suffered a string of injuries which caused him to miss 2 CT events. He went onto finish the 2016 season in 10th place. In 2017, Toledo won the J-Bay Open and the Hurly Pro at Trestles. However inconsistent result at other events saw him finish the 2017 season in 10th place. In 2018, Toledo won the J-Bay Open for the 2nd year in a row as well as the Rio Pro. He also went onto to finish the 2018 season in 3rd place, which was at the time his best season ending ranking. In 2019, Toledo won the Rio Pro for the 2nd year in a row and made 2 finals appearances at the Rip Curl Pro and Surf Ranch Pro. He finished the 2019 season in 4th place. In the 2021 season, Toledo won 2 CT events and finishing 2nd overall, after a runner-up finish to Gabriel Medina at the inaugural WSL Finals. Most recently, in the 2022 season, Toledo won his first ever Championship Tour, placing 1st place and beating fellow Brazilian surfer, Italo Ferreira at the RIP Curl WSL finals. 
For his whole professional career, Filipe Toledo has represented the tip of the spear of the progressive surfing movement. Small in stature, but massive with his moves, especially in the aerial realm. According to his peers, Toledo’s volatility was the only thing stopping him from achieving his dream of a World Title. His high-flying act also makes him vulnerable to injury and his early youthful passion has led to a series of costly mental errors (he was suspended for one event in 2017 for his behavior in the wake of an interference call). He currently rides Sharp Eye Surfboards with a FCS II fin setup.

Career

Victories

WSL World Championship Tour

References

External links

1995 births
Living people
Sportspeople from São Paulo (state)
Brazilian surfers
World Surf League surfers
People from Ubatuba